This is a list of alleged sightings of unidentified flying objects or UFOs in Poland.

10 May 1978, Emilcin 

A farmer in Emilcin is said to have been abducted and medically examined by short, green-faced, humanoid entities speaking an unearthly language in a white, hovering, humming craft. There is now a memorial at the site.

19 January 2009, Jarnołtówek 
On 1 AM, Adam Maksymów of the village Jarnołtówek near Prudnik went outside to charge his car battery. He was interrupted by a noise which he likened to rockets blasting off. Then he heard a buzzing sound which he compared to that of a swarm of bees. He saw a blinding light and a huge saucer with a triangular glowing blue beam on its underbelly rose above the ground and took off into the night sky at an impossible speed. Other people of Jarnołtówek also reported seeing the object.

See also 
 List of reported UFO sightings

References

Poland
Historical events in Poland